Hebeloma pseudoamarescens is a species of mushroom in the family Hymenogastraceae.

pseudoamarescens
Fungi of Europe